The 2006–07 Women's National Cricket League season was the 11th season of the Women's National Cricket League, the women's domestic limited overs cricket competition in Australia. The tournament started on 11 November 2006 and finished on 28 January 2007. Defending champions New South Wales Breakers won the tournament for the ninth time after finishing second on the ladder at the conclusion of the group stage and beating Victorian Spirit by two games to one in the finals series.

Ladder

Fixtures

1st final

2nd final

3rd final

Statistics

Highest totals

Most runs

Most wickets

References

External links
 Series home at ESPNcricinfo

 
Women's National Cricket League seasons
 
Women's National Cricket League